A Tribute to Carl Albert is a live album by heavy metal band Vicious Rumors, released in 1995. This live album is a compilation of recordings done in 1994 during their European Tour and put together as a tribute to singer Carl Albert.

Tracks 1 through 14 were recorded live, while tracks 15-17 are previously unreleased studio tracks.

Track listing
"On the Edge"
"Abandoned"
"No Fate"
"Ministry of Fear"
"Digital Dictator"
"Against the Grain"
"The Voice"
"Hell Razor"
"Thunder and Rain Pt. 1"
"Thunder and Rain Pt. 2"
"Worlds and Machines"
"Thinking of You"
"Down to the Temple"
"Don't Wait for Me"
"My Machine"
"Put the Blame on Me"
"Indisintegration"

Personnel
 Geoff Thorpe: Guitars
 Mark McGee: Guitars
 Carl Albert: Vocals
 Tommy Sisco: Bass
 Dave Starr: Bass (on My Machine, Put the Blame on Me and Indisintegration)
 Larry Howe: Drums

Rationale
The details for the recording rationale is included into the album as follow:

Dedication
"This album is dedicated to the Best Singer & Friend in the World"

Carl Albert
1962–1995

References

1996 live albums
Vicious Rumors albums
Tribute albums